Artem Tyshchenko (born 22 December 1993) is a Ukrainian biathlete. He participated at the 2018 Winter Olympics.

Career
Tyshchenko was a two-time bronze medalist of the 2012 Junior World Championships. During the next three years he won five medals at European championships. He debuted at the World Cup in the 2013-14 season in sprint in Antholz, Italy, where he placed 90th. It was the only time he played for the national team that year.

The next season he got a permanent spot in national team. In Oberhof he reached his personal best as of January 2018 - coming 10th in sprint. On February 6, 2015, he had his first World Cup relay podium in single mixed relay which debuted at the World Cup. He was third with Yuliya Dzhyma. At the end of the season Tyshchenko was named by IBU "best young biathlete". Next season wasn't successful - Tyshchenko competed at World Cup only in one race in Canadian Canmore where he placed 62nd.

On February 16, 2016, Artem was banned for violating doping laws by testing positive for the substance meldonium. Later the World Anti-Doping Agency decided that a concentration of meldonium less than 1 mcg could be acceptable if the doping probe was taken before March 1, 2016. All sanction against Tyshchenko were lifted on April 19.

On May 3, 2016, Tyshchenko survived a severe car accident. When he was on a way from Lviv to Sumy with his girlfriend Snizhana Tisyeyeva (a biathlete who competes for Moldova) his car burned out. Artem had a concussion and Snizhana experienced burns. She needed surgery for which the national federation and fans donated money. It was presumed that Artem fell asleep while driving at 5 am and crashed into speed bumps and then into a tree. He recovered to compete the next season in IBU Cup only. He participated at 2017 Winter Universiade where he won bronze in mixed relay.

During 2017-18 Biathlon World Cup he returned to Ukrainian national team but won no World Cup points. Coaches assumed that his results decline is caused by health problems after the car accident.

Artem qualified to represent Ukraine at the 2018 Winter Olympics. He competed in one race, placing 29th, the best result among Ukrainian biathletes.

Results

Winter Olympics

World Championships

World Cup

Relay podiums

Rankings

IBU Cup

Relay podiums

References

External links
 Biathlon.com.ua
 IBU Datacenter

1993 births
Living people
Ukrainian male biathletes
Ukrainian sportspeople in doping cases
Doping cases in biathlon
Biathletes at the 2018 Winter Olympics
Olympic biathletes of Ukraine
Universiade bronze medalists for Ukraine
Universiade medalists in biathlon
Competitors at the 2017 Winter Universiade
Sportspeople from Sumy Oblast